Journeyman is an American science-fiction romance television series created by Kevin Falls for 20th Century Fox Television which aired on the NBC television network. It starred Kevin McKidd as Dan Vasser, a San Francisco reporter who involuntarily travels through time. Alex Graves, who directed the pilot, and Falls served as executive producers.

The show premiered on September 24, 2007, airing Mondays at 10 p.m. Eastern Time. The initial order from the network was for 13 episodes, all of which were produced prior to the 2007 Writers Guild of America strike by screenwriters. However, the series suffered from low ratings, and NBC canceled it in April 2008. The final episode of Journeyman aired on Wednesday, December 19, 2007.

Plot
The series centers on Dan Vasser, a newspaper reporter living with his wife Katie and young son Zack in San Francisco. For an unknown reason, one day he begins "jumping" backward in time. He soon learns that each series of jumps follows the life of a person whose destiny he is meant to change. Dan's jumping affects his family life and his job, and instills suspicion in his brother Jack, a police detective. While in the past, Dan reconnects with his ex-fiancée, Livia, whom he had believed was killed in a plane crash but who is actually a fellow time traveler.

Fictional cosmology

Dan's "shifts" through time occur seemingly at random. The only indication he has to an oncoming jump is a feeling in his head which varies from right before he jumps to several seconds of warning. Initially, the feelings were headaches. However, as the series progresses the headaches become less painful. Dan appears to have no control over the shifts. The first jump is several decades into the past; through a series of jumps, he jumps nearer to the present, usually years at a time. When Dan met Evan in the series finale, Evan told Dan that he was a traveler too. It was implied that Evan had traveled to different time periods at random. The same can be inferred with Livia, who claims that she has gone through many jumps of her own. But her jumps are quite different from Dan's.

The jumps manifest themselves with a small blue flash and a ripple as Dan appears to vanish from the present, and appear instantly in the past. He is missing from the present for a period of time unrelated to the period he spends in the past. His disappearances and reappearances are rarely witnessed by anyone else. Dan does not arrive in the same location he departed, but instead arrives near the person who he is supposed to help. His jumps are typically restricted to the area he leaves from, usually keeping him in the San Francisco area. Originally, when Dan arrives to the past, he is unconscious. But as the series goes on, Dan somehow gets a hold on the jumps. It becomes evident when Dan feels the jumps coming on and as the jump occurs, he is seen walking with the ripples being shown behind him. Dan is also trying to figure out the mechanics of his travels. He has questioned a physicist who seems to have known his father in the past, and has discussed the possibility of tachyon particles being able to cause time jumps. It is now clear that the scientist is aware of Dan's travels, as well as those of others like him. It has also been discovered that those born around the time of a rare passing comet (the fictional "Joseph-Lee" comet) have this ability.

Dan's journeys appear to each have an innate purpose, which is not always apparent to him, but involves positively changing the destiny of a certain person. Likewise, fate seems to conspire against him if he tries to alter other events beyond his current charge. Alterations Dan makes to the timeline affect the present and the memories of everyone in it. However, his own memories are unaltered, and he recalls events as they originally occurred before his interference.

Dan is not alone in his tendency to time-travel. His ex-fiancée Livia, thought to have been killed in a plane crash, actually traveled back to her "home time", 1948, from where she jumps forward in time. Dan meets Livia on his jumps into the past, as she jumps into her future to offer her experience and assistance with Dan's missions. As revealed in the episode "Perfidia", there was at least one other person who also jumps through time, named Evan. However, the death of that individual occurs shortly before Dan experiences his first jump in the first episode, bringing the whole series full circle, making Dan believe that the loss of Evan as a time traveler created a void which Dan filled. Livia and Dan also sensed that Livia's purpose in accompanying him came to an end at that point, and that they would not see much of each other after that mission.

Cast and characters

Dan Vasser (played by Kevin McKidd) is a reporter for the fictional newspaper the San Francisco Register. Dan is the main protagonist of the series, who finds himself jumping through time, unable to stop or control the jumps.  He has a son, Zack, with his wife of 7 years, Katie — his brother's ex-girlfriend. Dan was previously engaged to Livia Beale before her disappearance and supposed death in a plane crash. Dan is a recovered gambling addict.
Katie Vasser (played by Gretchen Egolf) is Dan's wife and mother of their son Zack. Until recently, she was the only one in the present who knew about her husband's time-traveling. Katie was the long-time girlfriend of Dan's brother Jack. Since their break-up nine years ago, the two have remained somewhat distant; partly because Katie ended up getting pregnant by Dan and they married soon after. Before marrying Dan, Katie was a television reporter. In response to cutbacks at the Register, and Dan's traveling, Katie returns to television to ensure a stable income for the family.
Olivia "Livia" Beale (played by Moon Bloodgood) is Dan's ex-fiancée who was presumed dead after a plane crash nearly ten years before the start of the series. It is revealed that she is actually a time traveler from 1948 who jumps into the future. After not being able to jump home for an uncertain number of years, she was stuck in Dan's present and adapted to life there, where she began a legal career and fell in love with Dan, only to finally jump back home while on the plane before it crashed. In "Blowback" and in the final episode, "Perfidia", she and Dan speculated that Dan was the target of her extended jump, and that her mission was to get Dan and Katie together (which was arguably a result of her supposed death). For unknown reasons, she now jumps to the same times that Dan visits, and offers him advice and assistance in his missions.
Jack Vasser (played by Reed Diamond) is Dan's brother. Jack, a police detective, is dating Dr. Theresa Sanchez (Lisa Sheridan), but also has feelings for Katie (his ex). Jack forms a number of misconceptions about Dan's disappearances and apparent irresponsibility, refusing to believe his brother when Dan tries to explain the time traveling. Believing Dan has perhaps returned to his gambling vice, Jack uses his police resources to investigate Dan's life. Jack is finally convinced of Dan's time traveling when Livia meets with Jack to enlist his help in getting Dan out of a desperate situation.
Hugh Skillen (played by Brian Howe) is the editor-in-chief of the San Francisco Register and Dan's boss and friend.
Zack Vasser (played by Charles Henry Wyson) is Dan and Katie's son, who has seen Dan disappear, believing it to be magic. Dan often fears leaving his son as his father left him when he was Zack's age.

Main crew
Kevin Falls, Alex Graves, Joan Binder Weiss, J.R. Orci, Neal Ahern, Megan Mascena, Matt McGuinness, Paul Redford, David Hyman, Juan Carlos Coto, Tom Szentgyorgyi, Dana Calvo, and Robert J. Ulrich (Casting Director).

Production 
Exteriors of the Vasser family home were shot at Foy House, 1337 Carroll Ave., Angelino Heights, Echo Park, Los Angeles. At the end of episode ten the Innes House made famous as Halliwell Manor in the series Charmed can be seen next door to the south-east.

Episodes of the show were made available online, and NBC distributed the pilot on a fall-preview DVD at Blockbuster and other retail video-rental stores.

United Kingdom's Sky One, Australia's Channel Ten, TV3 in New Zealand and Canada's Global network acquired broadcast rights to the series.

When the show was not renewed for a full season, some Journeyman supporters initiated an attempt to revive production of the series by sending boxes of Rice-A-Roni (a product associated with San Francisco) to NBC, echoing the "Nuts" campaign which led to a second season of the CBS series Jericho. Journeyman creator Kevin Falls acknowledged the campaign in his blog, saying "Your fight to save Journeyman has humbled and moved us. I'm certainly not going to tell you to stop now". However, Falls also said that there were long odds against a revival, stating "Journeyman will likely not be getting a back nine order."  As of April 2, 2008, the show was confirmed as officially canceled by NBC.

Episodes

Reception
The series premiere, "A Love of a Lifetime", was watched by 9.2 million people, and received a 3.5/9 share among adults 18–49 years old. Mike Pearson of the Rocky Mountain News felt that Journeyman cannibalized past television shows Early Edition and Quantum Leap.  In his opinion, the second episode was more coherent than the first. Tony Whitt of IfMagazine.com gave "A Love of a Lifetime" an A−, and felt that one aspect of Journeyman that was better than Quantum Leap was its love story. He also liked the acting in "A Love of a Lifetime" and called star McKidd "damn watchable".  Karla Peterson of The San Diego Union-Tribune felt that "A Love of a Lifetime" was "a deft mix of supernatural wizardry and grown-up drama".

U.S. ratings

See also
Quantum Leap

References

External links 
 

2007 American television series debuts
2007 American television series endings
2000s American romance television series
2000s American science fiction television series
2000s American time travel television series
English-language television shows
NBC original programming
American time travel television series
Television series by 20th Century Fox Television
Television shows set in San Francisco
Television series set in the 1970s
Television series set in the 1980s
Television series set in the 1990s